NCC Bank Limited or National Credit and Commerce Bank Limited is a Bangladeshi private commercial bank. Mohammad Mamdudur Rashid is the present Managing Director and CEO of the bank.

History 
NCC Bank was founded in 1985 as an investment company in the name of NCL (National Credit Limited). It became a scheduled commercial bank after receiving permission from the central bank in 1993 and started with a paid up capital of Tk. 39 crore.
The point of the organization was to assemble assets from inside and put them in such path in order to build up nation's Industrial and Trade Sector and assuming an impetus part in the arrangement of the capital market too.

National Credit and Commerce Bank Limited bears a unique history of its own. The organization started its journey in the financial sector of the country as an investment company back in 1985. The aim of the company was to mobilize resources from within and invest them in such way so as to develop country's Industrial and Trade Sector and playing a catalyst role in the formation of capital market as well. Its membership with the browse helped the company to a great extent in these regard. The company operated upto 1992 with 16 branches and thereafter with the permission of the Central Bank converted into a full fledged private commercial Bank in 1993 with paid up capital of Tk. 39.00 crore to serve the nation from a broader platform. Since its inception NCC Bank Ltd. has acquired commendable reputation by providing sincere personalized service to its customers in a technology based environment. The Bank has set up a new standard in financing in the Industrial, Trade and Foreign exchange business. Its various deposit & credit products have also attracted the clients-both corporate and individuals who feel comfort in doing business with the Bank.

References

External links

Banks of Bangladesh